Manuelia is a genus of bees in the subfamily Xylocopinae, the only genus in the tribe Manueliini. There are three species.

This tribe is relictual. Today it is limited to Chile and Argentina.

These are small, slender bees measuring up to 8.5 millimeters long. They may be metallic blue or matte black, sometimes with reddish parts on the abdomen. Because Manuelia species are so distinct from each other, the genus is divided into two subgenera.

Species
 Manuelia gayatina (Spinola, 1851)
 Manuelia gayi (Spinola, 1851)
 Manuelia postica (Spinola, 1851)

Notes

References 
Michener, C. D. (2007). The Bees of the World, 2nd Edition, Johns Hopkins University Press.

Xylocopinae
Hymenoptera of South America